Shine a Light is the fourteenth studio album by Canadian singer-songwriter Bryan Adams, released on March 1, 2019, by Polydor Records. The album's title track, co-written by Ed Sheeran, was released on January 17, 2019. The album debuted at number one on the Canadian Albums Chart and won the Juno Award for "Best Adult Contemporary Album" in 2020.

Track listing

Charts

Weekly charts

Year-end charts

Certifications

References

2019 albums
Bryan Adams albums
Juno Award for Adult Contemporary Album of the Year albums